This is a list of the games played by the Croatia men's national handball team since Croatia gained independence from Yugoslavia in 1991 and their first match in 1942.

List of matches

Sources
Croatia World Champ., European Champ. and Olympic Games results
Croatia Statoil World Cup results
Croatia handball Super Cup results

Literature
7m - Revija Hrvatskog rukometnog saveza, Hrvatski Rukometni Savez, 1994

Handball in Croatia